Dato' Mohamad Taufek bin Abdul Ghani is a Malaysian politician and currently serves as Negeri Sembilan State Executive Councillor.

Early life 
Born on 30 September 1968, he is from Kampung Pulau Bintongan, Rembau, Negeri Sembilan.

Family 
He married Mahani Musa (a teacher) and had 4 children. His eldest son and second child are twins, Muhammad Syukri (born 1997) and Muhammad Sobri (born 1997).

Education 
Started studying at Sekolah Rendah Kebangsaan King George V, Seremban (1975-1980) then Sekolah Menengah Kebagsaan King George V, Seremban (1981 - 1983). He then moved to MARA Junior College of Science Seremban and studied for two years (1984 - 1985). He continued his studies at the matriculation level at the UKM Matriculation College, Kulim for two years (1986 - 1987) before continuing his studies at Universiti Kebangsaan Malaysia in the Bachelor of Chemical Engineering until 1992.

Involvement in politics 
He has been quite active in politics since becoming a student again. He served as the Head of the Special Duties Committee (EXCO), Student Welfare Department (JAKSA) Kamsis Ungku Omar (now known as Ungku Omar College (1990-1991). He later took on the role of Member of the Representative Council Students (MPP) Universiti Kebangsaan Malaysia (UKM).

In 2003, he was appointed as the Information Chief of the PAS Negeri Sembilan Youth Council until 2005. Subsequently, in 2005, he was appointed as the Deputy Head of the PAS Negeri Sembilan Youth Council, as well as the Deputy Director of the PAS Negeri Sembilan Election Department. He served in both positions until 2007.

In 2007 until 2009, he was elected as the Head of the PAS Negeri Sembilan Youth Council. As a result, he was also given an invitation (responsibility) as the Chairman of Lajnah Perpaduan Nasional PAS Negeri Sembilan. He also serves as the Chairman of the Consumer and Environment Lajnah of the Central PAS Youth Council, as well as the EXCO of the Central PAS Youth Council.

In 2009, he continued to climb the ladder of change after being appointed Deputy Commissioner of PAS Negeri Sembilan. Apart from that, he also served as a Member of the PAS Central Committee after being appointed by the Central PAS Leadership after the PAS Election for the 2009-2011 session.

At the grassroots level, he was appointed as the President of PAS Kawasan Rembau, Negeri Sembilan in 2008.

On 12 June 2011, he was appointed as the new PAS Negeri Sembilan Commissioner. He received information on his appointment as the new Negeri Sembilan Commissioner to replace Zulkefly Mohamad Omar while on board to cross the Bosporus Strait in Istanbul, while joining the Malaysian delegation to Turkey to review the progress of the Turkish election.

Work experience 
He used to work as a Production Engineer at Hualon Corporation (M) Sdn Bhd which operated in Melaka from 1992 to 1995. In addition, he also worked as a Senior Engineer at Samsung Corning (M) Sdn Bhd which operates in Seremban, Negeri Sembilan.

During his tenure, he underwent work training in Korea (1996 & 2004) and served in Nepal, Korea and Bangladesh throughout 2004-2006.

Involvement in society

Non-governmental organizations 
He is active in community activities. He was the Deputy Chairman of Surau An-Nur, Kampung Pulau Bintongan, Rembau in 2001-2002. In 2006, he served as a Member of the Madrasah Committee of Tuan Haji Abdul Rahman Ali (Also known as Madarasah Kampung Selemak, Rembau) for two years (2007).

Other positions he held was the Chairman of the Space Club Malaysia Negeri Sembilan (2007-2008), member of the Yayasan Amal Malaysia (2006-2008), and member of the Core Committee for the Empowerment of Indonesia (2005-2008).

Election results

Honours 
  :
  Knight Commander of the Order of Loyalty to Negeri Sembilan (DPNS) – Dato' (2020)

References 

National Trust Party (Malaysia) politicians
21st-century Malaysian politicians
Members of the Negeri Sembilan State Legislative Assembly
Negeri Sembilan state executive councillors
Living people
1968 births
People from Negeri Sembilan
Malaysian people of Malay descent